Medial medullary syndrome, also known as inferior alternating syndrome, hypoglossal alternating hemiplegia, lower alternating hemiplegia, or Dejerine syndrome, is a type of alternating hemiplegia characterized by a set of clinical features resulting from occlusion of the anterior spinal artery. This results in the infarction of medial part of the medulla oblongata.

Presentation
The condition usually consists of:

Sensation to the face is preserved, due to the sparing of the trigeminal nucleus.

The syndrome is said to be "alternating" because the lesion causes symptoms both contralaterally and ipsilaterally. Sensation of pain and temperature is preserved, because the spinothalamic tract is located more laterally in the brainstem and is also not supplied by the anterior spinal artery (instead supplied by the posterior inferior cerebellar arteries and the vertebral arteries).

Pathophysiology

The anterior spinal artery arises bilaterally as two small branches near the termination of the vertebral arteries which descend anterior to the medulla and unite at the level of the foramen magnum. The infarction (which arises in the paramedian branches of the anterior spinal artery and/or the vertebral arteries) leads to death of the ipsilateral medullary pyramid, the medial lemniscus, and the hypoglossal nerve fibers that pass through the medulla. The spinothalamic tract is spared because it is located more laterally in the brainstem and is not supplied by the anterior spinal artery, but rather by the vertebral and posterior inferior cerebellar arteries. The trigeminal nucleus is also spared, since most of it is higher up in the pons, and the spinal part of it found in the medulla is lateral to the infarct.

Diagnosis
Ipsilateral signs and symptoms - flaccid paralysis (lmn) paralysis and atrophy of one half of tongue (hypoglossal nerve)

Contralateral signs and symptoms-spastic (umn) paralysis of trunk and limbs (contralateral corticospinal tract)
Impaired tactile, proprioceptive and vibration sense of trunk and limbs (contralateral medial lemniscus)

Management

See also
 Alternating hemiplegia of childhood
 Lateral medullary syndrome
 Lateral pontine syndrome
 Medial pontine syndrome

References

External links 

Brain disorders
Syndromes affecting the nervous system